Power transformation may refer to:

Energy transformation
Power transform